The Law Enforcement Conduct Commission is responsible for investigating allegations of serious misconduct by the NSW Police Force and NSW Crime Commission. It was established on 1 July 2017 to replace the Police Integrity Commission

The Inspector of the Law Enforcement Conduct Commission is a statutory position which investigates complaints against the Law Enforcement Conduct Commission (LECC) in New South Wales, a state of Australia. It was established along with the LECC on 1 July 2017. The first Inspector to be appointed was former Supreme Court judge Terry Buddin, in 2017.

History 
The establishment of the LECC was first announced in 2015. In January 2017, it was announced that former NSW Supreme Court justice Michael Adams would be its first Chief Commissioner. In February 2020 it was announced that the government had decided not to extend Adams' contract as Chief Commissioner, and that it would look for a new Commissioner.

Investigations 
In March 2021, a Commission investigation found that police officers tasked with investigating outlaw motorcycle gangs had harassed a solicitor in retaliation for his actions in representing a member of one of those gangs in criminal proceedings. Due to the police harassment, the solicitor was forced to withdraw from representing his client.

Controversy 
In March 2018, the LECC complained that, due to funding cuts, it had been unable to investigate over 50 complaints of police misconduct over the preceding seven months.

In August 2018, Chief Commissioner Adams alleged that the then-NSW Police Minister, Troy Grant, had instructed him not to hire senior staff from the former Police Integrity Commission, on the grounds that doing so would upset the police union, the NSW Police Association.

In June 2020, the NSW Government proposed expanding the eligibility for the role of Chief Commissioner beyond retired judges; the state opposition objected that the proposal was an example of the government "failing to take oversight bodies seriously".

References

Government agencies of New South Wales
Police oversight organizations
New South Wales Law Enforcement Conduct Commission
2017 establishments in Australia
Government agencies established in 2017
Law enforcement in New South Wales